The 2006 Asian Men's Youth Handball Championship (2nd tournament) took place in Tehran from 25 June–30 June. It acts as the Asian qualifying tournament for the 2007 Men's Youth World Handball Championship in Bahrain.

Results

Final standing

References
www.handball.jp (Archived 2009-09-04)

External links
www.asianhandball.com

International handball competitions hosted by Iran
Asian Mens Youth Handball Championship, 2006
Asia
Asian Handball Championships